Spring Creek East Township is a township in Dent County, in the U.S. state of Missouri.

Spring Creek East Township was named from Spring Creek, which flows through it.

References

Townships in Missouri
Townships in Dent County, Missouri